

Season summary
Athletic had finished second the previous season, and though they gathered only five points fewer - all from losing instead of drawing games - this was enough to drag them down to 8th place. 

The club had applied and qualified for the Intertoto Cup, but in the end declined to enter the competition.

Squad
Squad at end of season

Left club during season

La Liga

League table

Results

Champions League

Group stage

References

Athletic Bilbao seasons
Athletic Bilbao